Sarita is a census-designated place (CDP) in, and the county seat of Kenedy County, Texas, United States. It is the only settlement of note in the county, and as of the 2010 census had a population of 238. Sarita has been ranked the most politically liberal town in Texas.

History

Sarita was created in 1904 as the headquarters of the Kenedy Ranch and was named by its founder, John G. Kenedy, after his daughter. The town grew to about 300 residents by 1916, when a major hurricane swept through the area and many settlers moved away. (In 1999, the largest Texas hurricane in 20 years, Bret, came ashore near Sarita but did little damage.) Although the town was made county seat when Kenedy County was created in 1921, it has not grown appreciably since then.

Today, Sarita is home to a Catholic church, a school, several homes, a post office, and the Lebh Shomea House of Prayer, all centered on the headquarters of the Kenedy Ranch, but no businesses are active other than the ranch. The 1921 Kenedy County Courthouse is a two-story white Beaux-Arts structure on a large green and the most prominent building in town; many county employees actually live in Kleberg County just to the north, as there is limited housing available in Sarita or Kenedy County. Across the street sits the whitewashed, two-story headquarters of the Kenedy Pasture Company, which owns most of the land in the county and employs many of Sarita's citizens. The building also houses the Kenedy Ranch Museum.

"Occupation" hoax
In 2014, a fake news website called National Report published an article claiming that a militia of "over one hundred armed La Raza militants" had occupied Sarita, forcing original residents out of their homes and using the town as a base of operations. The hoax report circled on the Internet.

Geography

Cityscape
Gary Cartwright of Texas Monthly said that Sarita's only landmarks were a green sign reading "Sarita", a water tower, and a blinking yellow light. Sarita has an elementary school and a Catholic church. The only lodging establishment, as of 2004, is a bed and breakfast operated by justice of the peace Patti Fain. The only venue that sells soft drinks is a vending machine at the Kenedy County courthouse. Sarita does not have any convenience stores, shops, or cafes. The nearest grocery store is in Kingsville, though there are convenience stores at gas stations in Riviera  to the north along US 77. The nearest major medical center is in Corpus Christi.

Climate
The climate in this area is characterized by hot, humid summers and generally mild to cool winters. According to the Köppen climate classification system, Sarita has a humid subtropical climate, abbreviated "Cfa" on climate maps.

Demographics

2020 census
Note: the US Census treats Hispanic/Latino as an ethnic category. This table excludes Latinos from the racial categories and assigns them to a separate category. Hispanics/Latinos can be of any race. 

As of the 2020 United States census, there were 205 people, 129 households, and 115 families residing in the CDP.

Education
Sarita Elementary School (PreK-6) of the Kenedy County Wide Common School District serves Sarita.

Students who graduate from Sarita Elementary move on to De La Paz Middle School and Kaufer Early College High School, operated by Riviera Independent School District, which takes all secondary students from the KCWCSD area.

See also

Kingsville micropolitan area

References

External links
 Handbook of Texas Online article
 

Census-designated places in Texas
Census-designated places in Kenedy County, Texas
County seats in Texas
Kingsville, Texas micropolitan area
Populated places established in 1904
1904 establishments in Texas